The 1990–91 Scottish Premier Division season was won by Rangers, two points ahead of Aberdeen. Rangers had seemed on course for a comfortable victory in the championship, but a loss of form around the time of manager Graeme Souness leaving the club allowed a surging Aberdeen to take the lead in the championship after 35 games. Rangers won a league deciding match against Aberdeen in the final game of the season at Ibrox. Mark Hateley scored twice in a 2–0 victory for Rangers, giving them their third successive league championship. Due to a league expansion from 10 to 12 teams, no clubs were relegated.

Clubs

Stadia and locations

Managers

Managerial changes

League table

Results

Matches 1–18
During matches 1-18 each team plays every other team twice (home and away).

Matches 19–36
During matches 19-36 each team plays every other team a further two times (home and away).

See also
 Aberdeen F.C.–Rangers F.C. rivalry
 Nine in a row

References

Scottish Premier Division seasons
1
Scot